Răcoasa is a commune located in Vrancea County, Romania. It is composed of five villages: Gogoiu, Mărăști, Răcoasa, Varnița and Verdea. It is situated in the historical region of Western Moldavia.

Mărăști village was the site of the World War I Battle of Mărăști.

Notable people
 Aurel Iancu
 Gheorghe Vlădescu-Răcoasa

References

Communes in Vrancea County
Localities in Western Moldavia